Osor may refer to these places and jurisdictions :

 Osor, Croatia, town, former bishopric and present Latin Catholic titular see
 Osor, Girona, village in Catalonia
 Bishop of Osor
 Open Source Observatory and Repository

See also 
 Osorio (disambiguation)
 Osorno (disambiguation)